The G 2000 BB is a four axle heavy shunting and mainline locomotive, designed by German company Vossloh  and built at the former MaK plant in Kiel. At the time of its introduction in 2000 it was the most powerful hydraulic transmission locomotive in Vossloh's range.

History and design

The locomotive was unveiled at Innotrans in 2000. The initial model had an asymmetric cab (see image) with a walkway; the asymmetric cab design allows the walkway to extend all the way to each end of the locomotive; coupled with remote control operation this means that shunting can be done from an external viewpoint whilst still riding on the locomotive.

The design is modular with various components (engine, drive etc.) coming from different suppliers. External styling was by Tricon-Design.

A second variant was produced, this time with a symmetrical cab; two different versions of this model were produced - one for the Italian market (G 2000-2 BB) with left hand drive (trains in Italy generally keep to the left) and another (G 2000-3 BB) with right hand drive for Germany. The new cabs had seating for two operators, in other respects apart from the cab these two models are identical to the initial asymmetric offering.

Starting in 2004, two further sub designs were made: G 2000-4 BB with a MTU engine which increase the power to 2700 kW. This variant also included a hydrodynamic retarder (a type of braking system) as part of the Voith supplied transmission package. 

Operators and use

The locomotives are certified for use on the railways of Germany, Switzerland, Italy, Netherlands, Belgium, France, Sweden, Denmark and Poland.

The locomotives are operated by many companies, many of them on lease. Angel Trains and MRCE both act as leasing companies, with Angel Trains providing the vast majority of the leased locomotives. Other owners include Azienda Consorziale Trasporti (ACT) and SBB Cargo (as class SBB Am 840)

The machines find use in northern Italy and in the German Ruhr region as well as being used for cross border traffic in the Benelux region. Railion, Euro Cargo Rail, Rail4chem and others all use this locomotive. The locomotives are used for freight. In Italy, these are notably owned by TPER, which uses them in some of its cargo services under the operations of Dinazzano Po.

The Swedish rail company Hector Rail operates a G 2000-4 and a 2000-5 machine.

See also 
List of Deutsche Bahn AG locomotives and railbuses

References

Sources

External links

, also see other owners linked within

Vossloh locomotives
Diesel locomotives of Sweden
B-B locomotives
Railway locomotives introduced in 2000
Standard gauge locomotives of Belgium
Diesel-hydraulic locomotives
Standard gauge locomotives of Germany
Standard gauge locomotives of Switzerland
Standard gauge locomotives of Italy
Standard gauge locomotives of the Netherlands
Standard gauge locomotives of Denmark
Standard gauge locomotives of Sweden
Standard gauge locomotives of Poland